Kallinge is a locality situated in Ronneby Municipality, Blekinge County, Sweden with 4,561 inhabitants in 2010. It is an industrial and garrison town and is situated about 5 km north of Ronneby.

The settlement grew up around an ironworks in the latter half of the 19th century.

Since 1944 Kallinge has had an air force base (Blekinge Wing). It is also an airport for civil aircraft called Ronneby Airport.

References 

Populated places in Ronneby Municipality